Fabian Schleusener (born 24 October 1991) is a German professional footballer who plays as a forward for Karlsruher SC.

Career
In July 2019, Schleusener joined 2. Bundesliga  club 1. FC Nürnberg on a three-year contract. The transfer fee paid to SC Freiburg was reported as about €450,000. After Schleusener did not score a goal during the regular season, he found the net in the sixth and last minute of stoppage time in the relegation second leg against Ingolstadt 04, which saved 1. FC Nürnberg from relegation to the 3. Liga.

Career statistics

References

External links
 

Living people
1991 births
Sportspeople from Freiburg im Breisgau
German footballers
Association football forwards
Bahlinger SC players
SV Waldhof Mannheim players
SC Freiburg players
FSV Frankfurt players
Karlsruher SC players
SV Sandhausen players
1. FC Nürnberg players
2. Bundesliga players
3. Liga players
Footballers from Baden-Württemberg